The gender taxonomy is a classification of the range of different levels at which humans vary in sexual characteristics. It is mainly used by medical specialists working in the area of sex research.
John Money and Milton Diamond are probably the best known researchers in this field. Money earned his PhD for research into human hermaphroditism and pseudohermaphroditism, now known as intersex conditions. The taxonomy starts at the simplest, biological level and traces differentiations expressed at the increasingly complicated levels produced over the course of the human life cycle.

Types of gender taxonomy

Gendered sexuality taxonomy 

A taxonomy of gendered sexuality, presented below, can better define the terms relevant to human sexuality and takes into account the interaction over time among sex, gender, and sexual fantasies, desires, practices of persons in intimate relationships at both the level of self-identity and attribution by others, however factual, biological differences in gender remains unequivocally binary. 

The taxonomy is a combination of classifications based on the genetic sexes of persons in relationships and categorizations based on those persons' social genders to arrive at classifications of gendered sexuality. 

Terminology for this taxonomy was drawn from everyday language and can be used for descriptive, diagnostic, and theoretical purposes.

Notes and references 

Sex differences in humans